Haji Ally Matumla (born May 25, 1968) is a retired male boxer from Tanzania, who represented his native East African country as a bantamweight at the 1988 Summer Olympics in Seoul, South Korea. He also competed at the 1990 Commonwealth Games, winning a silver medal in the men's featherweight division. In the final he lost to England's John Irwin.

External links
 Profile
 thecgf

1968 births
Living people
Tanzanian male boxers
Bantamweight boxers
Featherweight boxers
Flyweight boxers
Boxers at the 1988 Summer Olympics
Boxers at the 1990 Commonwealth Games
Boxers at the 1994 Commonwealth Games
Olympic boxers of Tanzania
Commonwealth Games silver medallists for Tanzania
Commonwealth Games medallists in boxing
Medallists at the 1990 Commonwealth Games